The seventh Mandala of the Rigveda ("book 7", "RV 7") has 104 hymns. In the Rigveda Anukramani, all hymns in this book are attributed to   Vashista. Hymn 32 is additionally credited to Sakti Vashista, and hymns 101-102 (to Parjanya) are additionally credited to Kumara Agneya.
It is one of the "family books" (mandalas 2-7), the oldest core of the Rigveda, which were composed in early vedic period (1500-1000 BCE).

The hymns are dedicated to Agni, Indra, the Visvadevas, the Maruts, Mitra-Varuna, the Asvins, Ushas (Dawn), Indra-Varuna, Varuna, Vayu (Wind), two each to Sarasvati, Rudra, the Waters, the Adityas, Vishnu, Vastospati, Brhaspati, one each to the Apris, to Vashista, Savitar, Bhaga, the Dadhikras, the Rbhus, Dyaus and Prthivi (Heaven and Earth), Parjanya (Rain) and  Indra-Soma. 7.103 is dedicated to the frogs.

The rivers mentioned in the 7th Mandala are the Sarasvati, Asikni, Parusni and possibly the Yamuna (in 7.18.19 the name of a helper of Indra, maybe also the name of a woman or goddess). Hymns 95 and 96 are entirely dedicated to Sarasvati.

The verse 7.59.12, probably a late addition, gained importance as Mahāmrityunjaya Mantra or Tryambakam mantra.

The battle of ten kings
The Battle of the Ten Kings is a battle alluded to in the Rigveda (Book 7, hymns 18, 33 and 83.4-8), the ancient Indian sacred collection of Vedic Sanskrit hymns. The battle took place during the middle or main Rigvedic period, near the Ravi River in Punjab. It was a battle between the Puru Vedic Aryan tribal kingdoms of the Bharatas, allied with other tribes of the north west India, guided by the royal sage Vishvamitra, and the Trtsu (Puru) king Sudas, who defeats the Bharatas.

References

External links 

 – English translation by Ralph T. H. Griffith

Rigveda